In military strategy, a choke point (or chokepoint) is a geographical feature on land such as a valley, defile or bridge, or maritime passage through a critical waterway such as a strait, which an armed force is forced to pass through in order to reach its objective, sometimes on a substantially narrowed front and therefore greatly decreasing its combat effectiveness by making it harder to bring superior numbers to bear. A choke point can allow a numerically inferior defending force to use the terrain as a force multiplier to thwart or ambush a much larger opponent, as the attacker cannot advance any further without first securing passage through the choke point.

Historical examples

Some historical examples of the tactical use of choke points are King Leonidas I's defense of the Pass of Thermopylae during an invasion led by Xerxes I of Persia; the Battle of Stamford Bridge in which Harold Godwinson defeated Harald Hardrada; William Wallace's victory over the English at the Battle of Stirling Bridge (Wallace had around 2,300 men against the English army of about 9,000 to 12,000 men and the bridge collapsed during the battle); and the Battle of Agincourt in which Henry V of England decisively defeated the French using a small army (consisting mainly of lightly equipped longbowmen) when the much larger force of French heavy cavalry were forced to charge at the Englishmen through a narrow muddy gap in the Azincourt Woods.

The many archipelagos of the Caribbean offered several maritime choke points that attracted pirates and buccaneers during the height of their activities in the 17th and early 18th century. The Spanish treasure fleets leaving the Americas would have to pass through those waters to pick up the strong, prevailing westerly winds that would take them back to Spain across the North Atlantic.

Some choke points, with important locations in parentheses:

 Strait of Hormuz between Oman and Iran at the entrance to the Persian Gulf
 Bab-el-Mandeb passage from the Arabian Sea to the Red Sea (Yemen and Socotra)
 Strait of Malacca between Malaysia and Sumatra (Indonesia)
 Panama Canal and the Panama Pipeline connecting the Pacific and Atlantic Oceans
 Suez Canal and the Sumed Pipeline connecting the Red Sea and Mediterranean Sea (Egypt)
 Strait of Gibraltar along the Atlantic Ocean entering the Mediterranean Sea (Spain, Gibraltar and Morocco)
 Strait of Dover or English Channel separating the Atlantic Ocean and the North Sea (England and France)
 Waterbodies connecting the Pacific and Atlantic oceans including:
 Strait of Magellan (Chile)
 Beagle Channel (Chile and Argentina)
 Drake Passage
 The Cape of Good Hope (South Africa)
 Bering Strait (United States of America and Russia)
 Bosporus Strait linking the Black Sea (and oil coming from the Caspian Sea region) to the Mediterranean Sea (Turkey)
 Dardanelles Strait connecting the Sea of Marmara with the Aegean Sea (Turkey)
 Strait of Tartary along Sea of Japan and Sea of Okhotsk (Russia)

The Fulda Gap was seen as one of the potentially decisive bottleneck battlegrounds of the Cold War in Germany.

Royal Navy choke points

From the 18th to the early 20th centuries, the sheer size of the United Kingdom's Royal Navy meant it had control over much of the world's oceans and seas. Choke points were of huge importance to the British Empire, which often used them to control trade in British colonies and, to a lesser extent, for defense. Choke points have also been a source of tension, notably during the Suez Crisis. The Royal Navy still deems its choke points as strategically vital. Indeed, the importance of choke points was first recognised by British Admiral John Fisher.

These are major British choke points today:
 The English Channel
 GIUK gap (between Greenland, Iceland, and UK)
 Strait of Gibraltar

The choke points still have significant strategic importance for the Royal Navy. The GIUK gap is particularly important to the Royal Navy, as any attempt by northern European forces to break into the open Atlantic would have to do so through the heavily defended English Channel, which is also the world's busiest shipping lane, or through one of the exits on either side of Iceland. Considering British control over the strategic fortress of Gibraltar at the entrance to the Mediterranean, Spain (northern coast), France (Atlantic coast) and Portugal are the only mainland European nations that have direct access to the Atlantic Ocean in a way that cannot be easily blocked at a choke point by the Royal Navy. The GIUK gap was also a strategically important part of the Cold War, as the Royal Navy were given the responsibility of keeping an eye on Soviet submarines trying to break into the open Atlantic.

Importance
Choke points remain a prominent issue today in the global economy and shipments of goods, particularly oil: 20% of the world's oil is shipped through the Strait of Hormuz. In 2018, 20.7 million barrels per day were transported through the strait. The choke point has undergone continuous unrest since the 1980s. This includes, the downing of Iran Air Flight 655 by an American surface-to-air missile in 1988, the collision between nuclear submarine USS Newport News and crude tanker Mogamigawa in 2007, U.S.–Iranian naval dispute in 2008 and 2011–2012, seizure of MV Maersk Tigris in 2015 and threats of a strait closure in 2018 and 2019 made by the Islamic Republic of Iran. Most recently, in April 2020, statements from Iran's military shows its readiness to defend its territorial integrity.

The Suez Canal and the Sumed pipeline carry  a day, and the canal carried a total of 7.5% of world trade in 2011. The canal was closed for eight years after the Six-Day War in 1967. In many instances, alternate routes are nonexistent or impractical. For example, an alternate to the Suez/Sumed route required an additional  around Cape of Good Hope. The Royal Navy also still deems its choke points to the Atlantic as strategically important.

Threats to the Strait of Hormuz 
The Strait of Hormuz, connecting the Persian Gulf and Arabian Sea, is one of the world's most strategically important maritime choke points. The Islamic Republic of Iran is one of the largest security threats in the Strait of Hormuz and remains an essential factor in global energy security, due to the high volume of oil and natural gas passing through the narrow openings on a daily basis. The sovereignty of The Islamic Republic of Iran extends, beyond its land territory, internal waters and its islands in the Persian Gulf, the Strait of Hormuz and the Oman Sea. Iran has used its sovereignty to threaten to close down the Strait of Hormuz multiple times, due to sanctions imposed on the country. This aposes serious threats to the global oil market, with the Strait of Hormuz as a key location. Iran's capabilities are found in the country's anti-access/area denial capabilities including small attack craft equipped with machine guns, multiple-launch rockets, anti-ship missiles and torpedoes. Naval mining has also been used  as a strategy to threaten the security of the Strait of Hormuz. Lastly, the many naval exercises and unconventional methods used by the Islamic Republic of Iran Navy, is a display of capability and shows readiness to take action in the choke point. The strategic value of maritime choke points such as the Strait of Hormuz means that the threats to the choke point influence sharp rises in oil prices. The several attacks which have occurred over the last decade against oil facilities and tankers in or near the Strait of Hormuz, has had a large impact on the oil industry. From the perspective of security studies, Iran is an important player in the international oil economy.

See also
 Land (economics)
 Strategic geography
 Sea lines of communication
 String of Pearls (China)

References

Geopolitics
International security
Military logistics
Military strategy
Military geography